Judith's Paarl is a suburb of Johannesburg, South Africa. It is a small suburb found on the eastern edge of the Johannesburg central business district (CBD), tucked between the suburbs of Lorentzville and Bezuidenhout Valley, with Troyeville and Kensington to the south. It is located in Region F of the City of Johannesburg Metropolitan Municipality.

History
The suburb was founded on one of the original farms on the Witwatersrand, after a strip of land was sold from the farm Doornfontein. It originates around 1896. The suburb is possibly named after a daughter of the Lorentz family. Other sources are Judith Cornelia Estresia, wife of the original farmer owner F.C. Bezuidenhout. It had a terminus for the Johannesburg tramway network on the corner of Ascot Road and First Street.

References

Johannesburg Region F